The Bach Medal is awarded by the Lord Mayor of Leipzig during the Bachfest Leipzig in recognition of efforts to promote the work of Johann Sebastian Bach. The Bach Medal of the City of Leipzig is an annual award.

Jury
Source:

 Members of the artistic directorate of Bachfest
 Thomaskantor
 Rector of the University of Music and Theatre Leipzig
 Gewandhauskapellmeister
 Intendant of Leipzig Opera

Recipients

 2003 Gustav Leonhardt
 2004 Helmuth Rilling
 2005 Sir John Eliot Gardiner
 2006 Ton Koopman
 2007 Nikolaus Harnoncourt
 2008 Hermann Max
 2009 Frieder Bernius
 2010 Philippe Herreweghe
 2011 Herbert Blomstedt
 2012 Masaaki Suzuki
 2013 Peter Schreier
 2014 Akademie für Alte Musik Berlin
 2015 
 2016 Peter Kooij
 2017 Reinhard Goebel
 2018 Robert D. Levin
 2019 Klaus Mertens
 2020 Angela Hewitt
 2021 Christoph Wolff and Hans-Joachim Schulze
 2022 András Schiff

References

External links

German music awards
Awards established in 2003
Classical music awards
Medals
Johann Sebastian Bach